Latheticus is a genus of beetles belonging to the family Tenebrionidae.

The genus has almost cosmopolitan distribution.

Species:
 Latheticus oryzae Waterhouse, 1880 
 Latheticus prosopis Chittenden, 1904

References

Tenebrionidae